Pleuronaia is a genus of freshwater mussels, aquatic bivalve mollusks in the family Unionidae, the river mussels. They are native to the United States.

Some members of this genus were formerly included under the now-obsolete name Lexingtonia.

Species
 Pleuronaia barnesiana
 Pleuronaia dolabelloides ("slab-sided naiad")
 Pleuronaia gibberum

References

 
Bivalve genera